The team jumping was an equestrian event held as part of the Equestrian at the 1912 Summer Olympics programme. It was the first appearance of the event.  Unlike the team eventing competition, the team jumping was not simply a sum of scores from the individual jumping competition.  Instead, riders competed in the team event separately a day after the individual event.  Different riders could be used in the two events, and teams were limited to 4 riders while each nation could send 6 individuals.

Results

3 minutes and 50 seconds were allotted.  190 points was the maximum score.  The top three jumpers for each team counted their scores, which were summed to give a team score.

References

Sources
 
 

Equestrian at the 1912 Summer Olympics